The Republic of Vietnam Military Forces (RVNMF;  – QLVNCH), were the official armed defense forces of the defunct Republic of Vietnam and was responsible for the defense of the state since its independence from France in October 1955 to its demise in April 1975.

Branches
The QLVNCH was formally established on December 30, 1955, by the strongman and republican first South Vietnamese president Ngo Dinh Diem, which he declared on October 26 that year after winning a rigged referendum on the future of the State of Vietnam.  Created out from ex-French Union Army colonial Indochinese auxiliary units (French: Supplétifs), gathered earlier in July 1951 into the French-led Vietnamese National Army (VNA) (Vietnamese: Quân Đội Quốc Gia Việt Nam – QĐQGVN), Armée Nationale Vietnamiènne (ANV) in French, the armed forces of the new state consisted in the mid-1950s of ground, air, and naval branches of service, respectively:

 Army of the Republic of Vietnam (ARVN)
 Republic of Vietnam Air Force (VNAF)
 Republic of Vietnam Navy including Marine Corps

Their roles were defined as follows: to protect the sovereignty of the free Vietnamese nation and that of the Republic; to maintain the political and social order and the rule of law by providing internal security; to defend the newly independent Republic of Vietnam from external (and internal) threats; and ultimately, to help reunify Vietnam – divided since the Geneva Accords in July 1955 into two transitional states, one at the north ruled by Ho Chi Minh’s  Marxist Lao Dong Party regime and the other in the south under Diem's regime.

Command structure

Regional commands

See also
 Cambodian Civil War
 First Indochina War
 Khmer National Armed Forces
 Laotian Civil War
 Royal Lao Armed Forces
 Royal Thai Armed Forces
 Republic of Vietnam National Police
 Republic of Vietnam Marine Division
 Provincial Reconnaissance Unit
South Vietnamese military ranks and insignia
 People's Army of Vietnam
 Vietnamese National Army
 Vietnam War
 Weapons of the Vietnam War

Notes

References
Gordon L. Rottman and Ron Volstad, US Army Special Forces 1952-84, Elite series 4, Osprey Publishing Ltd, London 1985. 
Gordon L. Rottman and Ron Volstad, Vietnam Airborne, Elite Series 29, Osprey Publishing Ltd, London 1990. 
Gordon L. Rottman and Ramiro Bujeiro, Army of the Republic of Vietnam 1955-75, Men-at-arms series 458, Osprey Publishing Ltd, Oxford 2010. 
Kenneth Conboy and Simon McCouaig, South-East Asian Special Forces, Elite series 33, Osprey Publishing Ltd, London 1991. 
Lee E. Russell and Mike Chappell, Armies of the Vietnam War 2, Men-at-arms series 143, Osprey Publishing Ltd, London 1983. .
Leroy Thompson, Michael Chappell, Malcolm McGregor and Ken MacSwan, Uniforms of the Indo-China and Vietnam Wars, Blandford Press, London 1984. ASIN: B001VO7QSI
Martin Windrow and Mike Chappell, The French Indochina War 1946-54, Men-at-arms series 322, Osprey Publishing Ltd, Oxford 1998. 
Phillip Katcher and Mike Chappell, Armies of the Vietnam War 1962-1975, Men-at-arms series 104, Osprey Publishing Ltd, London 1980.

Further reading
Jade Ngoc Quang Huynh, South Wind Changing, Graywolf Press, Minnesota 1994. ASIN: B01FIW8BJG
Mark Moyar, Triumph Forsaken: The Vietnam War, 1954-1965, Cambridge University Press, Cambridge, U.K. 2009. , 0521757630
Neil L. Jamieson, Understanding Vietnam, The Regents of the University of California press, Berkeley and Los Angeles, California 1995. ASIN: B00749ZBRC
Nguyen Cao Ky, How we lost the Vietnam War, Stein & Day Pub 1979. , 0812860160
Tran Van Don, Our Endless War: Inside Vietnam, Presidio Press, Novato, California 1978. , 0891410198

Vietnam
Military units and formations disestablished in 1975